The Platinum Tour presented by Crystal Light is the fifth headlining concert tour by American country music singer Miranda Lambert. The tour was in support of her fifth studio album, Platinum (2014). The first leg of the tour began on July 10, 2014, in Fort Loramie, Ohio and ended on September 20, 2014, in Honolulu with there being thirty dates for that leg. Lambert kicked off the second leg called, the "Certified Platinum Tour" on January 15, 2015, in Evansville, Indiana. This leg will end on July 9, 2015, in Calgary, Alberta. The third leg called the "Roadside Bars & Pink Guitars Tour" began on September 25, 2015, in Billings, Montana and ended on October 19, 2015. The tour ended on March 13, 2016. The 2015 legs of tour grossed $20 million.

Background
The tour was first announced in May 2014, and began on July 10, with the first leg ending on September 20. Lambert says, "Platinum represents a lifestyle for me. It's the color of my hair, wedding ring, my airstream trailer, so it's just a natural fit for the name of my new album and its why we decided to name the tour Platinum too." A second leg was later added beginning on January 2, 2015 and will end on March 26. The shows in March 2016 are a part of the C2C: Country to Country festival and will be Lambert's first European shows.

Concert synopsis
At the beginning of the show, there is "a montage paying homage to female pioneers", such as Sally Ride. Then on a black screen "a slogan in white text" and in capital letters appears saying, "Well-behaved women rarely make history." Before the show began, "there was a screening of the music video for "Somethin' Bad", her hit song with Carrie Underwood. Lambert starts the show with "Fastest Girl in Town" and closes with "Gunpowder & Lead". During "Famous in a Small Town" the video screen shows "clips of Lambert as a child and as a young country star starting her career."

On March 6, 2015, in Oklahoma City and on March, 7, in Wichita, Kansas, Lambert surprised the audience by bringing her husband, Blake Shelton up on stage to sing "God Gave Me You".

Fan interaction
Inspired by Lambert's song and video, "All Kinds of Kinds", Lambert wants to know what "kinds of kinds" the fans are. Concert goers can uploaded photos of themselves online for a chance for their photo to be shown on the big screen during the show.

Opening acts

Neal McCoy
RaeLynn
Danielle Bradbery
Florida Georgia Line
Tyler Farr
Justin Moore
Thomas Rhett

Setlist

"Fastest Girl in Town"
"Kerosene"
"Platinum"
"Little Red Wagon"
"Baggage Claim"
"Hard Staying Sober"
"Over You"
"All Kinds of Kinds"
"Me and Charlie Talking"
"Babies Makin' Babies"
"Famous in a Small Town"
"Mississippi Queen" 
"Mama's Broken Heart"
"Bring Me Down"
"Smokin' and Drinkin'"
"The House That Built Me"
"Automatic"
"New Strings"
"White Liar"
"Gunpowder and Lead"
Encore
 "Gravity Is a Bitch" 
"Somethin' Bad"

Tour dates

Fairs, festivals and other performances
 This concerts was a part of the Country Concert at Hickory Hills Lake.
 This concert was a part of the Great Jones County Fair.
 This concert was a part of the Faster Horses Fest.
 This concert was a part of the Oregon Jamboree.
 This concert was a part of Stagecoach Festival.
 This concert was a part of Big Barrel Country Music Festival.
 This concert was a part of Dauphin's Countyfest.
 This concert was a part of the North Dakota State Fair.
 This concert was a part of Cheyenne Frontier Days.
 This concert was a part of WE Fest.
 This concert was a part of the Pepsi Gulf Coast Jam.
 This concert was a part of Cause for the Paws.
 These concerts are a part of the C2C: Country to Country music festival.

Critical reception
Nate Chinen of the New York Times says, "She hit her marks, but seemed to be punching from a distance for the third of the show. It was as if she had grown weary of her own ironclad image, or the delivery system around it, or the many forms of upkeep required." "Whatever the case, as she labored, her band smoothly churned, with a balance of muscle and finesse."

The Wichita Eagle's Denise Neil remarked how Lambert thrilled the crowd at Intrust Bank Arena in Wichita.

Notes

References

External links
Lambert's Official Website

2014 concert tours
2015 concert tours
2016 concert tours
Miranda Lambert concert tours